The Road to San Vicente is a book by Leif Borthen about life in the tiny village of Sant Vicent de sa Cala in the far north east of the Spanish island of Ibiza. In 1933 Borthen had arrived in Ibiza and settled in the remote village, along with René Paul Gauguin, the grandson of the French artist Paul Gauguin.

Synopsis
The book is set in the remote valley in which Sant Vicent is situated. 
The story begins with Borthen’s arrival in 1933 and also on his return to the village in 1960, just before a road was completed into the valley. It chronicles the life of the local people and of the foreigners who live amongst them. Characters that include a notorious assassin, a roguish art dealer and eccentric aristocrat. The story leads the reader in to a world of rich Island traditions with house blessings, blood feuds and a fast vanishing rural way of life that would, and has, disappeared for good following the road construction in 1963.

Translation
The book has been translated into English by the author Martin Davies and Björn Lindholm but doesn’t include the first three original chapters, but starts at the end of the fourth chapter. The text includes a number of footnotes which help the reader with Scandinavian references and rounds out and updates historical material mentioned in the text.

Additional Texts
The last part of the book includes six additional text which are written by other authors who have recollections, researched or lived in the valley of Sant Vicent de sa Cala.

Contents
  Preface: The Pityusan Tibet  By Martin Davies
A Note on the Text

The Book
Chapter 1 Ibiza Revisited
Chapter 2 Flotsam and Jetsam
Chapter 3 Return to San Vicente
Chapter 4 Antique Hunter
Chapter 5 Priests and Postmen
Chapter 7 A Ghost from the Past
Chapter 8 Villain

The Additional Texts
An Excursion to San Vicente By Walter Benjamin
The Passing of San Vicente By Norman Lewis
San Vicente By Enrique Fanjarnés Cardona
The tax Collector’s Bread Oven By Jacques Massacrier
A Brief History of Sant Vicent By Emily Kaufman
Epilogue By Paul Richardson
Glossary
Contributors
Sources and Acknowledgements
Barbary Press
Index

References

Books and novels about Ibiza
1967 novels
20th-century Norwegian novels